Gökhan Kılıç (born January 6, 1988) is a Turkish  weightlifter competing in the –56 kg division.

He won the gold medal in Snatch category and the silver medal lifting 256.0 kg in total at the 2011 European Weightlifting Championships held in Kazan, Russia. At the 2012 European Championships held in Antalya, Turkey, he became bronze medalist.

Achievements

References

External links
International Weightlifting Federation

1981 births
Living people
Turkish male weightlifters
Mediterranean Games bronze medalists for Turkey
Mediterranean Games medalists in weightlifting
Competitors at the 2009 Mediterranean Games
European Weightlifting Championships medalists
21st-century Turkish people